Heuzert is an Ortsgemeinde – a community belonging to a Verbandsgemeinde – in the Westerwaldkreis in Rhineland-Palatinate, Germany. The agriculturally structured residential community of Heuzert to the Verbandsgemeinde of Hachenburg, a kind of collective municipality. Its seat is in the like-named town.

Geography

The community lies in the Westerwald between Limburg and Siegen, on the river Nister in the nature and landscape conservation area of the Kroppach Switzerland.

History
In 1286, Heuzert had its first documentary mention as Hutcenrothe.

Politics

The municipal council is made up of 6 council members who were elected in a majority vote in a municipal election on 7 June 2009.

Economy and infrastructure

South of the community runs Bundesstraße 414, leading from Hohenroth to Hachenburg. The nearest Autobahn interchanges are in Siegen, Wilnsdorf and Herborn on the A 45 (Dortmund–Gießen). The nearest InterCityExpress stop is the railway station at Montabaur on the Cologne-Frankfurt high-speed rail line.

References

External links
  Heuzert in the collective municipality’s Web pages 

Municipalities in Rhineland-Palatinate
Westerwaldkreis
Kroppach Switzerland